The Miracle Centre Cathedral is a Pentecostal megachurch in Kampala, the capital of Uganda. The church's Senior Pastor is Robert Kayanja. In 2017, the attendance is 15,000 people.

History 
The church is founded in 1991 by Robert Kayanja.  

The Cathedral was inaugurated in 2004, in the Rubaga district of Kampala, with a seating capacity of 10,500. 

According to Kayanja, the Cathedral's congregation has planted over 1,000 other Miracle Centre Churches across Uganda, and over 2 million Ugandans have professed faith in Christ at its crusades.   

In 2017, the church of Kampala has 15,000 people.

Proclaim music 
Proclaim music is the children's choir of the church.

Humanitarian aid
Its charitable work in Kampala includes care for street children, orphans and people with AIDS.

References

External links
Official website

Cathedrals in Uganda
Buildings and structures in Kampala
Evangelical megachurches in Uganda
Pentecostalism in Africa
Pentecostal churches
1991 establishments in Uganda